Brumovice is a municipality and village in Břeclav District in the South Moravian Region of the Czech Republic. It has about 1,000 inhabitants.

Twin towns – sister cities

Brumovice is twinned with:
 Záhorská Bystrica (Bratislava), Slovakia

References

External links

 

Villages in Břeclav District